Edward D. Head (August 5, 1919 – March 29, 2005) was an American prelate of the Roman Catholic Church.  He served as the 11th bishop of the Diocese of Buffalo in New York from 1973 to 1995.  He previously served as an auxiliary bishop of the Archdiocese of New York from 1970 to 1973.

Early life

Edward Head was born on August 5, 1919 in White Plains, New York, and was raised in the South Bronx. His parents were Charles and Nellie Head, immigrants from England and Ireland, respectively. Head had two brothers, Charles and Daniel.

Both Head attended Catholic parochial schools, then earned a mathematics degree from Columbia University. He entered St. Joseph's Seminary in Yonkers, New York, in 1939.

Priesthood 
Head was ordained a priest for the Archdiocese of New York on January 27, 1945 by Cardinal Francis Spellman at St. Patrick's Cathedral in Manhattan, New York City.  Head earned a master's degree from the New York School of Social Work in 1948.

Head served in many capacities, including as an educator, prior to being appointed auxiliary bishop. He taught sociology at Notre Dame College on Staten Island before serving as assistant pastor at both Sacred Heart Parish in the Bronx and St. Roch's Parish on Staten Island.

In September 1947, Head became a staff member of the archdiocesan Catholic Charities Family Service Department. He served an assistant pastor at St. Veronica's Parish in Greenwich Village, New York City, for 17 years while he worked at Catholic Charities.

Head was named associate director of Family Services in March 1948, serving in that capacity until he became director of social research for Catholic Charities in 1956. Pope John XXIII honored Head in July 1962 by naming him a papal chamberlain. In 1964, Head went to minister at St. Monica's Parish in Manhattan.In May 1966, Head was given the title of domestic prelate by Pope Paul VI.

On October 15, 1966, Head was appointed executive director and secretary of Catholic Charities by Cardinal Terence Cooke.  In these capacities in the organization, Head oversaw nearly 1,000 employees, and administrated an annual budget of millions of dollars.  Head became a parochial assistant at St. Patrick's Cathedral in 1967.

Auxiliary Bishop of New York

On March 19, 1970, Head was consecrated an auxiliary bishop of the Archdiocese of New Yorkand as Titular Bishop of Ard Sratha.  Head served, among other assignments, as executive director of Catholic Charities in the archdiocese.

Bishop of Buffalo

On January 23, 1973, Head was named as the 11th Bishop of Buffalo by Pope Paul VI; and he was installed on March 19, 1973.

Fundraising for Catholic Charities increased by an extreme degree under Head's leadership in the Diocese, including the year of his retirement.

Head was involved in many activities as Bishop of Buffalo.  Under his leadership, many institutes and offices were created in the Diocese.  Many of these endeavors include the Religious Education Coordinators Council; the Priests' Retirement Board; the Center for Church Vocations; the Western New York Catholic Hospital Health Care Council; the Peace and Justice Commission; the Office of Vicar for Religious; and the Permanent Diaconate Program.

Additional efforts included the Office of Vicar for Campus Ministry; the Organist Enrichment Program; the Diocesan Marian Commission; the Office of Vicar for the Central City; Daybreak Productions; the Catholic Charities Parish Outreach Program; the Little Portion Friary; the Pope John Paul II Residence; the Agenda for the 80's; the Diocesan Radio Studio; and the Lay Ministry Advisory Board.

Further endeavors created and/or supervised by Head included the consolidation of the Catholic Education Department; the Renew Program; the Office of Church Ministry; the relocation and consolidation of Diocesan Offices in the Catholic Center; the Office of Black Ministry; the Hispanic Apostolate; the Commission on Women in the Church and Society; the Department of Pro-Life Activities; the New Visions Commission for Pastoral Planning; the reorganization of 10 Central City parishes; and others.

In 1995, upon celebrating the 50th anniversary of his ordination, Head reflected on his appointment as Bishop of Buffalo. Head is re-quoted in a WBFO article by Eileen Buckley, as well as on a page announcing his death on the Diocese of Buffalo website, in regard to his appointment as Bishop of Buffalo by Pope Paul VI, stating:

 In 1973, Pope Paul, VI, could have sent this church of Buffalo a wiser bishop, a holier bishop, a bishop more astute in administration, or a bishop more gifted in public speaking. But, I don't think Pope Paul could have sent the Diocese a bishop who had tried harder to love you and to serve you.

Head ordained 124 men to the priesthood during his time as Bishop of Buffalo.  It has been estimated that Head confirmed 50,000 young people to the Roman Catholic Church during his 22 years of service in Buffalo.

Retirement and later life

Pope John Paul II accepted Head's petition to retire as bishop of the Diocese of Buffalo in April 1995.  Church law required him to retire at age 75; and he was named Bishop Emeritus.  Even though he was retired, he continued to play an active role in the Diocese of Buffalo throughout the 1990s and into early part of the next decade.  He continued to be active in health care ministry, and other ministries throughout his retirement.   Prior to his death, Head was honored with a retirement home for priests that was named  the Bishop Edward D. Head Residence, in Lackawanna, New York.

Edward Head died on March 29, 2005, in Kenmore, New York, at the age of 85.Bishop Edward Kmiec was quoted in a March 30, 2005 Buffalo News article:

 This is a day of tremendous sadness for the family of the Diocese of Buffalo.  Bishop Head had a tremendous impact on the faith lives of Catholics in the eight counties of Western New York.

Head is buried in the crypt of St. Joseph Cathedral in Buffalo.  He was the first bishop of Buffalo to have retired in Buffalo.

References

External links
Bishop Head Dies

1919 births
2005 deaths
American Roman Catholic clergy of Irish descent
People from the Bronx
American people of English descent
Columbia University School of Social Work alumni
Catholics from New York (state)
20th-century Roman Catholic bishops in the United States
Roman Catholic bishops of Buffalo
St. Ann's Academy (Manhattan) alumni